Pachat-e Delita (also Romanized as Pāchāt-e Delītā; also known as Pāchāt) is a village in Ludab Rural District, Ludab District, Boyer-Ahmad County, Kohgiluyeh and Boyer-Ahmad Province, Iran. At the 2006 census, its population was 28, in 7 families.

References 

Populated places in Boyer-Ahmad County